David Booth Kansas Memorial Stadium is a football stadium located in Lawrence, Kansas, on the campus of the University of Kansas. The stadium was opened in 1921, and is the seventh oldest college football stadium in the country, and is widely recognized as the oldest west of the Mississippi River. Nicknamed "The Booth", the stadium is dedicated as a memorial to Kansas students who died in World War I, and is one of seven major veterans' memorials on the campus. The stadium is at the center of all seven war memorials - adjacent to the stadium, further up the hill is a Korean War memorial honoring Kansas students who served, just a few hundred feet south of the stadium stands the University of Kansas World War II Memorial, the Kansas Memorial Campanile and Carillon, the University of Kansas Vietnam War Memorial sits adjacent to the Campanile to the west, the Victory Eagle - World War I statue located on Jayhawk Boulevard, southeast of the stadium, and the Kansas Memorial Union, a veterans' memorial that also houses the main university student union and bookstore, located east of the stadium. The stadium is the home stadium of the Kansas Jayhawks football team.

On December 20, 2017, KU Chancellor Douglas Girod announced that the stadium would be renamed in honor of KU alumnus and donor David G. Booth, who pledged a donation of $50 million to overhaul the facility.

Construction and renovation

Memorial Stadium was built in 1920 funded by students, faculty, and fans. Originally the stadium had only east and west bleachers, which were expanded southward in 1925. The north bowl seating section was added in 1927 to give the stadium its horseshoe shape which it retains today. The west bleachers were expanded significantly upwards in 1963, with similar additions to the east side in 1965. A major renovation in 1978 repaired concrete and upgraded home and visiting team facilities.

Permanent lights were installed in 1997 and the current infrastructure is the result of a 1998 renovation. The press box and scholarship suites saw significant improvement and expansion in 1999, and the MegaVision video board was installed in the same year.

The field has been artificial turf since 1970. In the summer of 2009 the old AstroPlay surface was replaced with FieldTurf.

A new scoreboard with two video strips was mounted at the top of the stadium's north bowl for the 2005 season, correcting a quirk of the stadium that north-driving teams had no way to see the clock without turning around. In 2006, the playing field was named Kivisto Field in honor of prominent donor Tom Kivisto.

The University of Kansas broke ground on the new $31-million Anderson Family Football Complex on October 6, 2006, and it opened in 2008. The building includes offices, academic areas, a weight room, locker rooms, an audio-visual room, meeting rooms, a cardio room, a hydro-therapy room, a nutrition area and a display area. It is also joined by new practice fields to the southeast of the stadium.

On September 17, 2009, the Kansas Board of Regents approved a $34 million addition of luxury seating on the east side of the stadium.  The addition, known as the Gridiron Club, will increase the stadium's capacity by 3,000 seats.  However, as of 2020, construction has yet to begin.

In the summer of 2014 the track around the football field was removed and artificial turf was laid in its place.

The stadium was renovated in August 2017 with new seats, a new touchdown club behind the north end zone, and the outside walls with banners. The rim of the northern bowl also had a series of 5 flagpoles installed on both sides of the scoreboard, with one side set to feature American flags, and one side set to feature the state flag of Kansas.

On October 7, 2022, University of Kansas athletics announced an additional renovation would begin in 2023. This renovation will improve restrooms and concessions, implementing a seating bowl design, improvements to the concourses, and club and loge seats.

Capacity

The stadium's official capacity is 47,233. A then-record crowd of 51,574 saw the Jayhawks defeat Kansas State 25–18 in 1973.

At the Jayhawks' November 5, 2005 streak-snapping 40–15 victory over Nebraska, it was announced that that attendance record was broken, with a standing-room-only crowd of 51,750.

On November 18, 2006, a then attendance record of 51,821 fans watched the Jayhawks defeat Kansas State, 39–20. The home attendance average of 44,137 in seven games during the year set a new season record, surpassing the prior season's record of 43,675 in six contests. Over the last three seasons, stadium attendance has averaged more than 41,000 per game.

On November 1, 2008, the Jayhawks set a new record of 52,230 fans in attendance. The Jayhawks beat Kansas State 52–21 in the Sunflower Showdown.

On September 5, 2009, Kansas broke the record again as 52,530 fans watched the Jayhawks defeat Northern Colorado in the opening game of the Jayhawks' 2009 season.

Tenants

Kansas Jayhawks football

 In 2005, the Jayhawks went undefeated at Memorial Stadium for the first time since 1951. The team allowed just two touchdowns in first quarters at home during the season.
 In 2007, the Jayhawks went undefeated at home again, highlighted by a 76–39 victory over Nebraska. The 76 points by the Jayhawks was the third most scored in Kansas history, and also the most points given up in Nebraska history.

The Kansas Relays
Memorial Stadium also hosted the Kansas Relays track and field event every year from 1923 through 2013, except in 1943, 1944 and 1945 due to World War II and 1998 and 1999 due to construction. The Relays annually see top area high school and intercollegiate competitors, and the open events often draw Olympic runners such as Maurice Greene and Marion Jones. The Kansas Relays is the location where world-record holder Justin Gatlin tested positive for performance-enhancing drugs in 2006. Gatlin served a four-year suspension, but has since returned to track prominence.

In 2014, the Kansas Relays left Memorial Stadium and moved to Rock Chalk Park, a new multi-sport complex located northwest of the KU campus. The new track facility seats 7,000 and features a nine-lane, IAAF certified track.

High school football
The stadium has hosted numerous Kansas State High School Activities Association state championship games and Kansas Shrine Bowl all-star games. Local area high schools Lawrence High and Free State High have in the past played their annual rivalry game in the stadium, but as of 2018 have played traditional home-away games at their respective high schools.

Popular culture
 Prominently featured in the 1983 television movie, The Day After.

Top crowds
The following are the top 10 largest crowds in stadium history. Due to the capacity having been reduced since these games, these records will likely remain barring an expansion of the stadium. Also provided are the top crowds since capacity was reduced.

After capacity reduction

See also
 List of NCAA Division I FBS football stadiums

References

External links
 Memorial Stadium at kuathletics.com
 The Kansas Relays

American football venues in Kansas
Athletics (track and field) venues in Kansas
College football venues
Defunct athletics (track and field) venues in the United States
Kansas Jayhawks football
University of Kansas campus
1921 establishments in Kansas
Sports venues completed in 1921